Matthew Everett 'Rex' Smith (March 8, 1896 – January 18, 1972) was a player in the National Football League. He played with the Green Bay Packers during the 1922 NFL season.

References

1896 births
1972 deaths
American football ends
Beloit Buccaneers football players
Green Bay Packers players
Players of American football from Minnesota
People from Rushford, Minnesota